Gemini is the debut album by American indie rock act Wild Nothing, released on May 25, 2010, by Captured Tracks.

Critical reception

Gemini received largely positive reviews from contemporary music critics. Ian Cohen of Pitchfork praised the album, stating, "Wild Nothing doesn't feel like a facile genre exercise so much as honest personal expression borne of intense musical fanhood. And in a strange way, it becomes something of a deceptively joyous affair, a reminder of why so many songwriters retreat to bedrooms or garages to lose themselves in the music-making process."

Stereogum named Gemini the ninth best album of 2010. Pitchfork placed Gemini at number 49 on its year-end best albums list, while the track "Chinatown" placed at number 73 on its year-end best tracks list. In 2018, the site also listed Gemini at number 25 on its list of the 30 best dream pop albums.

Track listing

References

2010 debut albums
Wild Nothing albums
Captured Tracks albums